Alojz Bajc (born 20 April 1932) is a Yugoslav former cyclist. He competed in the individual road race at the 1960 Summer Olympics.

References

External links
 

1932 births
Living people
Yugoslav male cyclists
Olympic cyclists of Yugoslavia
Cyclists at the 1960 Summer Olympics